Manav Vij is an Indian actor working in Hindi and Punjabi language films. He debuted with Shaheed-E-Azam (2002) as Sukhdev and also featured in the television series Kyunki Saas Bhi Kabhi Bahu Thi. He went on to appear in Udta Punjab, Rangoon, Phillauri, Naam Shabana and Andhadhun. In 2022, he starred in Samrat Prithviraj and Laal Singh Chaddha.

Personal life
Vij was born in Firozpur, Punjab, India. He studied homoeopathy in Ludhiana Medical College and was a practising homoeopathy doctor before entering the acting profession.

He married Meher Vij in 2009 in Mumbai.

Filmography

Films

Television

References

External links
 
 

Indian male television actors
Living people
Indian male film actors
People from Firozpur
Male actors from Mumbai
1977 births